Anding District  may refer to:

 Anding District, Dingxi, Gansu, formerly Anding County
 Anding District, Tainan